Vincent H Pala (born 14 February 1968) is an Indian politician belonging to Indian National Congress. He is serving as the incumbent MP from Shillong constituency in the 17th Lok Sabha.

Early life and personal life

Vincent H Pala was born to John Dkhar and Hermelinda Pala on 14 February 1968, in Lamyrsiang village in East Jaintia Hills district of Meghalaya. He graduated in civil engineering from Jalpaiguri Government Engineering College and later he worked as assistant chief engineer in the Public Works Department of the Government of Meghalaya.

He married Dimorine Tariang and has four daughters: Dr. Wanmancy, Daphihi, Fiola, and Azaria. He resides at Edamanry Cottage, Dhankheti, Shillong.

Political career
Pala was a member of Shillong in the 2009 election. He held this seat in the 2014 elections and became a member of the 16th Lok Sabha.
Pala had been elected to the 15th Lok Sabha in 2009 representing Shillong. This was the first time he stood as a candidate for the Lok Sabha election. Initially he worked as Union Minister of States, Water Resources and later was selected as the Union Minister of State, Minority Affairs. He was re-elected in the 2014 election and was a member of the 16th Lok Sabha representing Shillong. He was again re-elected in the 2019 election from Shillong in the 17th Lok Sabha.

Positions held
Pala has also served in the following positions:
 President, Meghalaya Pradesh Congress Committee
 Chief Coordinator, Meghalaya Pradesh Congress Committee
 Asst. Chief Engineer, Public Works Department, 2000–2008, Government of Meghalaya
 Treasurer, Meghalaya Pradesh Congress Committee

References

External links
 Fifteenth Lok Sabha Members Bioprofile in Lok Sahba website

India MPs 2009–2014
Indian National Congress politicians from Meghalaya
1968 births
Living people
People from Shillong
People from East Jaintia Hills district
Lok Sabha members from Meghalaya
India MPs 2014–2019
India MPs 2019–present
People associated with Shillong